Daniel Pehlivanov (Bulgarian: Даниел Пехливанов; born 1 July 1994) is a Bulgarian professional footballer who plays as a midfielder.

Career

Dunav Ruse
On 18 June 2018 Pehlivanov signed a contract with the Bulgarian First League team Dunav Ruse. He made his professional debut for the team in the first league match of the season against Vitosha Bistritsa on 20 July 2018.

References

External links
 
 

1994 births
Living people
Bulgarian footballers
Bulgaria youth international footballers
OFC Vihren Sandanski players
FC Pirin Razlog players
FC Septemvri Sofia players
FC Dunav Ruse players
FC Hebar Pazardzhik players
SFC Etar Veliko Tarnovo players
First Professional Football League (Bulgaria) players
Association football midfielders
People from Sandanski
Second Professional Football League (Bulgaria) players
Sportspeople from Blagoevgrad Province
21st-century Bulgarian people